Veľká Fatra (also Great Fatra or Greater Fatra) is a mountain range in the Western Carpathians in Slovakia. The Veľká Fatra lie to the southeast of the better known Malá (Lesser) Fatra mountains and are less developed, as well as being lower.

Geology
In the geomorphological system, it is a part of the Fatra-Tatra Area. It is situated approximately among the towns of Ružomberok, Harmanec, Turčianske Teplice and Martin. The Turiec Basin and the Lesser Fatra mountains are situated to the north west of the range and the Low Tatras mountains are in the east. It can be divided into seven parts: Šípska Fatra, Šiprúň, Lysec, Hôľna Fatra, Revúcke podolie, Zvolen and Bralná Fatra.

The Zvolen massif connects the Veľká Fatra Range with the Low Tatra Range. One of the largest ski resorts in Slovakia - Skipark Ružomberok and Donovaly - lies beneath it. There are several other tourist and skiing resorts in the range.

A considerable part of the range is made of various Mesozoic rocks. The central part and the main ridge are made up of non-resistant rocks (slates) and the relief is softly modeled (Ploská, Ostredok). The southern and south-western part is formed by resistant limestone and dolomite with rocky walls and reefs. The ridges are usually separated by canyon-like valleys. The most important ones are Gader Valley (Gaderská dolina) and Blatnica Valley (Blatnická dolina). The longest valley is the Ľubochňa Valley (Ľubochnianska dolina) at 25 km. Numerous karst formations are located in this area and the Harmanec Cave is one of the best known caves in Slovakia.

Scenery
Nearly 90% of the area is covered by forests – beech and beech-fir forests, in some places replaced by spruce plantations and relics of pines. The area of Harmanec is the richest yew-tree site in Europe. The original natural upper borderline of forests was lowered during the Wallachian colonization. There are many extensive upland pastures, where cattle is raised in the summer.

Most of the area was protected by the Veľká Fatra Protected Landscape Area since 1973, and the most valuable parts are included in the Veľká Fatra National Park since 2002. The rest of the former protected landscape area serves as a buffer zone now.

The ruins of Blatnický and Sklabinský castles are located in this area. Also, the traditional architecture of Vlkolínec (a UNESCO's World Heritage Site) and Liptovské Revúce and the Ľubochňa and Turčianske Teplice spas can be found here.

Viewpoints 
 Rakytov (1,567 m)
 Krížna (1,574 m) - the best view of the southern mountains - Kremnické vrchy, Poľana, Vtáčnik
 Tlstá (1,208 m) - view of Turiec basin

Gallery

See also
Mountain Rescue Service (Slovakia)

References

References

External links

Veľká Fatra
Hiking map of Veľká Fatra by Military Cartographic Institute (VKÚ Harmanec)
Another hiking map with hike planner

 
Mountain ranges of Slovakia
Mountain ranges of the Western Carpathians